The bromate anion, BrO, is a bromine-based oxoanion. A bromate is a chemical compound that contains this ion. Examples of bromates include sodium bromate,, and potassium bromate,.

Bromates are formed many different ways in municipal drinking water. The most common is the reaction of ozone and bromide:

 Br +  → BrO

Electrochemical processes, such as electrolysis of brine without a membrane operating to form hypochlorite, will also produce bromate when bromide ion is present in the brine solution.

Photoactivation (sunlight exposure) will encourage liquid or gaseous bromine to generate bromate in bromide-containing water.

In laboratories bromates can be synthesized by dissolving  in a concentrated solution of potassium hydroxide (KOH). The following reactions will take place (via the intermediate creation of hypobromite):

 + 2 OH− → Br + BrO + 

3 BrO → BrO + 2 Br

Human health issues 
Bromate in drinking water is undesirable because it is a suspected human carcinogen. Its presence in Coca-Cola's Dasani bottled water forced a recall of that product in the UK.

Bromate formation during ozonation 

Although few by-products are formed by ozonation, ozone reacts with bromide ions in water to produce bromate. Bromide can be found in sufficient concentrations in fresh water to produce (after ozonation) more than 10 ppb of bromate—the maximum contaminant level established by the USEPA. Proposals to reduce bromate formation include: lowering the water pH below 6.0, limiting the doses of ozone, using an alternate water source with a lower bromide concentration, pretreatment with ammonia, and addition of small concentrations of chloramines prior to ozonation.

Reservoir pollution 

On December 14, 2007, the Los Angeles Department of Water and Power (LADWP) announced that it would drain Silver Lake Reservoir and Elysian Reservoir due to bromate contamination. At the Silver Lake and Elysian reservoirs a combination of bromide from well water, chlorine, and sunlight had formed bromate.

Natural occurrence 
Currently no bromate-bearing minerals (i.e., the ones with bromate ion being an essential constituent) are known.

See also
Other bromine anions:

References 

 
Carcinogens